Carl Raymond Davis,  (30 July 1911 – 6 September 1940) was a South African-born American-British pilot and flying ace of the Battle of Britain. He claimed nine enemy aircraft (and one shared) destroyed, four (and one shared) probably destroyed, and four damaged, before he was himself shot down and killed in action.

Davis was one of 11 American pilots who flew with RAF Fighter Command between 10 July and 31 October 1940, thereby qualifying for the Battle of Britain clasp to the 1939–45 campaign star.

Early years
Born in Krugersdorp, Transvaal in South Africa to American parents, Davis was educated in England at Sherborne School, and Trinity College, Cambridge (Bachelor of Arts) and at McGill University, Montreal (Bachelor of Arts qualifying as a mining engineer). He became a British citizen in 1932. His wife was Anne, sister of Sir Archibald Philip Hope, 17th Baronet,  of No.  601 Squadron (Hope was in turn married to Carl's sister Ruth.) After obtaining his mining degree, Davis took flying lessons in New Jersey while living with his sister.

Returning to the United Kingdom in 1935, Davis then lived in London and joined No. 601 Squadron, Auxiliary Air Force at Hendon, being commissioned in August 1936.

Second World War
Davis was called to full-time service on 27 August 1939 and, on 27 November, flew one of the six No. 601 Squadron Blenheims that attacked the German seaplane base at Borkum. On 11 July 1940, he shot down a Messerschmitt Bf 110, and he added two more Bf 110s on 11 August 1940 and three more Bf 110s on the 13th. Davis was awarded the Distinguished Flying Cross on 30 August. His citation read:

Death
Davis downed five more aircraft before being killed in action when a Messerschmitt Bf 109 shot down his Hawker Hurricane I (P3363) in combat over Tunbridge Wells at 09:30 hrs, 6 September 1940. Davis crashed, inverted, with his aircraft burned out in the back garden of Canterbury Cottage at Matfield, Brenchley, near Tunbridge Wells. He was 29 years old.

Remembrance 
2464 (Storrington) Squadron of the Air Training Corps observe an annual act of Remembrance to Flt Lt Davis along with the laying of a wreath at his grave in the churchyard at St Mary's, Storrington.

This service is held immediately following the Church's Battle of Britain service each year.

See also
List of Battle of Britain pilots
Non-British personnel in the RAF during the Battle of Britain
List of flying aces in the Battle of Britain

References

Notes

Bibliography

 Shores, Christopher and Clive Williams. Aces High. London: Grub Street, 1994. .

1911 births
1940 deaths
Carl
Alumni of Trinity College, Cambridge
Royal Air Force personnel killed in World War II
South African World War II flying aces
The Few
McGill University Faculty of Engineering alumni
People educated at Sherborne School
Royal Air Force pilots of World War II
Royal Air Force officers
Recipients of the Distinguished Flying Cross (United Kingdom)
Aviators killed by being shot down
Naturalised citizens of the United Kingdom
South African people of American descent
South African emigrants to the United Kingdom
American emigrants to England
South African military personnel
People from Krugersdorp